Potomac Creek is a  tidal tributary of the Potomac River in King George and Stafford counties, Virginia. Potomac Creek's source lies between the communities of Glendie and Paynes Corner in Stafford County.  It empties into the Potomac River at Marlboro Point. Potomac Creek forms as a dam to form Abel Lake.

Tributaries
Tributary streams are listed from source to mouth.
Long Branch
Beaverdam Run
Swamp Branch
Accokeek Creek

See also
Potomac Creek Bridge
Crow's Nest Natural Area Preserve
List of rivers of Virginia

References

Rivers of Stafford County, Virginia
Rivers of Virginia
Rivers of King George County, Virginia
Tributaries of the Potomac River